Betty Ida Roots (21 October 1927 – 24 October 2020) was a British-born zoologist based at the University of Toronto in Canada. She was an elected fellow of the Royal Society of Canada.

Career
In 1927, Roots was born in South Croydon Surrey, England, in the UK. She completed a Bachelor of Science degree in zoology at the University of London's University College (1949), a Diploma in Education at the Institution of Education (1950). and later, a doctorate in comparative physiology at the University of London (1981). Roots held a number of teaching and visiting scientist positions at a variety of institutions, including the Royal Free Hospital School of Medicine and the University of Illinois' Department of Physiology and Biophysics, before immigrating to Canada and joining the University of Toronto as an Associate Professor of Zoology in 1969.

Roots published over 100 academic papers which have been cited over 2,500 times, and had an h-index and i10-index of 30 and 61 respectively. She supervised various students in her laboratory, including Canadian astronaut Roberta Bondar. While at the University of Toronto, Roots served in a number of administrative roles, including the Associate Dean of Sciences at Erindale College (1976-1980), Chair of the Department of Zoology, and appointed Professor Emeritus in 1993. Roots also create a Collaborative Ph.D. program in Neuroscience at the University of Toronto. She was an Elected Fellow of the Royal Society of Canada, and served as president of the Royal Canadian Institute for Science in 1994.

Roots died, aged 93, on 24 October 2020.

Selected bibliography 
 Paul R Laming, H Kimelberg, S Robinson, A Salm, N Hawrylak, C Müller, B Roots, and K Ng. Neuronal–glial interactions and behaviour. Neuroscience & Biobehavioral Reviews. 2000.
 B Roots. Neurofilament accumulation induced in synapses by leupeptin. Science. 1983.
 Patricia V Johnston and Betty I Roots. Brain lipid fatty acids and temperature acclimation. Comparative Biochemistry and Physiology. 1964.
 B Roots. Phospholipids of goldfish (Carassius auratus L.) brain: the influence of environmental temperature.  Comparative Biochemistry and Physiology. 1968.
 B Roots. The water relations of earthworms: II. Resistance to desiccation and immersion, and behaviour when submerged and when allowed a choice of environment. Journal of Experimental Biology. 1956.

External links

References 

Women zoologists
20th-century British zoologists
1927 births
2020 deaths
Alumni of the University of London
20th-century Canadian zoologists
20th-century British women scientists
British emigrants to Canada